Brett John Mason (born 5 March 1962) is a former Australian politician and a Liberal/Liberal National of Queensland member of the Australian Senate from 1 July 1999 to 15 April 2015, representing the state of Queensland. Mason was the Australian Ambassador to the Netherlands from September 2015 to August 2018.

Education
Mason completed BA and LLB(Hons) degrees at the Australian National University, an MPhil degree in International Relations at Trinity Hall, University of Cambridge, and a PhD degree at Griffith University.

Parliamentary career
Following Mason's entry into the Senate in 1999, he was appointed Parliamentary Secretary to the Minister for Health and Ageing in the Howard Government from 21 March 2007 to 3 December 2007, and appointed Parliamentary Secretary to the Minister for Foreign Affairs in the Abbott Government from 18 September 2013 to 23 December 2014.

Along with senators Mitch Fifield and Mathias Cormann, Mason was one of the first to resign from the Coalition front bench in 2009 over the Shadow Cabinet's decision to support Kevin Rudd's ETS.

On 24 March 2015, Mason announced he intended to resign from the Senate prior to the parliament's budget sittings in May.  He resigned on 15 April 2015. The casual vacancy resulting from his resignation was filled by the appointment of Joanna Lindgren on 21 May 2015.

Diplomatic career
On 21 April 2015, six days after his resignation from the Senate, Foreign Minister Julie Bishop announced that Mason would be appointed as Australia's ambassador to the Netherlands, replacing Neil Mules in mid-2015. Mason presented his credentials in the Netherlands on 2 September 2015. He completed his posting in August 2018.

In June 2018 Mason was appointed the chair of the National Library of Australia's Library Council, commencing on 9 August 2018.

Honours
 Humanitarian Overseas Service Medal, 2003.

Publications

References

External links
 Summary of parliamentary voting for Senator Brett Mason on TheyVoteForYou.org.au
 Interview with Mason
 

1962 births
Living people
Abbott Government
Alumni of Trinity Hall, Cambridge
Ambassadors of Australia to the Netherlands
Australian barristers
Australian National University alumni
Griffith University alumni
Liberal National Party of Queensland members of the Parliament of Australia
Liberal Party of Australia members of the Parliament of Australia
Members of the Australian Senate
Members of the Australian Senate for Queensland
Academic staff of Queensland University of Technology
People from Canberra
21st-century Australian politicians
20th-century Australian politicians
National Library of Australia Council members